Bailey Hall (formerly known as the Chemistry Building), at the University of Kansas in Lawrence, Kansas, was built in 1905. The architect was John G. Haskell who was among the architects of the Kansas State Capitol. It was listed on the National Register of Historic Places in 2001. The building is home to the Center for Russian, East European, and Eurasian Studies, one of 11 National Resource Centers across the United States devoted to this region. Bailey is also home to the Communication Studies department.

See also 
 List of oldest buildings on Kansas colleges and universities

References 

University and college buildings on the National Register of Historic Places in Kansas
University of Kansas campus
1905 establishments in Kansas
National Register of Historic Places in Douglas County, Kansas